"On Broadway" is a song written by Barry Mann and Cynthia Weil in collaboration with the team of Jerry Leiber and Mike Stoller.

Composition
Weil and Mann were based at Aldon Music, located at 1650 Broadway, New York City, and the song as written by Mann/Weil was originally recorded by the Cookies (although the Crystals' version beat them to release) and featured an upbeat lyric in which the protagonist is still on her way to Broadway and sings "I got to get there soon, or I'll just die". The song was played as a shuffle.

When Leiber/Stoller let it be known that the Drifters had booked studio time for the following day and were a song short, Mann/Weil forwarded "On Broadway". Leiber and Stoller liked the song but felt that it was not quite right; the four held an overnight brainstorming session that culminated in the better-known version, now with a rock-oriented groove and with a more bluesy feel, which matched the new lyric in which the singer was now actually on Broadway and having a hard time.

The Drifters version
A young Phil Spector played the distinctive lead guitar solo on the Drifters' recording. The personnel for the Drifters recording were Rudy Lewis – lead vocals; Joe Newman, Ernie Royal – trumpets; Billy Butler, Bill Suyker, Everett Barksdale – guitars; Russ Savakus – bass; Gary Chester – drums; and Phil Kraus, Nick Rodriguez, Martin Grupp – percussion. The arranger was Garry Sherman.

The recording by the Drifters was a hit, reaching No. 9 on the Billboard Hot 100 in 1963.  Cash Box described it as "a haunting, slow beat cha cha opus...that sports a first rate Garry Sherman arrangement."

The Drifters' version was featured in a 1971 television public service announcement for Radio Free Europe (RFE). The Hungarian expatriate announcer is shown entering the RFE studio announcing "On Broadway", after which young Hungarians are shown listening to the "In sound from Outside".

George Benson version
George Benson's version of "On Broadway", from his 1978 album Weekend in L.A., hit No. 7 on the Billboard Hot 100 and No. 2 on the soul chart. Benson's take also has had substantial adult contemporary and smooth jazz radio airplay ever since. It won a Grammy Award for Best R&B Vocal Performance.

Benson's performance of the song was used in the 1979 film All That Jazz in a sequence that featured dancers on stage auditioning for a musical similar to Chicago. Benson also performed "On Broadway" with Clifford and the Rhythm Rats for the 1994 Muppets album Kermit Unpigged.

In theatre
 It was featured in the musical revue Smokey Joe's Cafe (1995).
 It is highlighted in the Carole King musical Beautiful (2013); Cynthia Weil and Barry Mann are characters in the show.

Other versions
Eric Carmen recorded a version of the song on his 1975 self-titled album.
Jimmy Scott recorded a version of the song on his 1969 album "The Source".
Gary Numan release a version. It was included in his Living Ornaments '79 tour and was renowned for its Billy Currie ARP Odyssey solo.

References

1963 songs
1963 singles
Songs written by Barry Mann
Songs with lyrics by Cynthia Weil
Songs written by Jerry Leiber and Mike Stoller
The Drifters songs
The Coasters songs
The Dave Clark Five songs
Eric Carmen songs
Bobby Darin songs
Percy Faith songs
Tom Jones (singer) songs
Johnny Mathis songs
James Taylor songs
Gary Numan songs
Frank Sinatra songs
Nancy Sinatra songs
Neil Young songs
George Benson songs
Disco-Tex and the Sex-O-Lettes songs
Atlantic Records singles
Warner Records singles
Songs about New York City